The National Natural Science Foundation of China (NSFC) is an organization directly affiliated to China's State Council for the management of the National Natural Science Fund.

History
NSFC was founded in February 1986 by theoretical chemist Tang Aoqing, with the approval of the State Council. It is an institution for the management of the National Natural Science Fund, aimed at promoting and financing basic research and applied research in China.

In 2010 NSFC launched a medical department, analogous to the United States' National Institutes of Health.  Plans for a medical department had been announced in 2001, but only with the 2008 appointment of Chen Zhu as health minister did basic biomedical research gain enough political support to push the department forward.  The medical department is expected to give about one billion renminbi in grants for 2010.

See also
National Science Foundation (U.S.)

References

External links
Official Website of NSFC 
Official Website of NSFC 
Science museums in China

Scientific organizations based in China
State Council of the People's Republic of China
Scientific organizations established in 1986
1986 establishments in China